Han Yue (born 18 November 1999) is a Chinese badminton player. She won the girls' singles title at the 2017 Asian Junior Championships, and the mixed team title at the World Junior Championships. Han was part of the national team that won the 2019 Tong Yun Kai Cup. Her best achievements in an individual event were becoming the champion at the BWF World Tour Super 300 2018 Syed Modi International and the 2022 Hylo Open.

Achievements

BWF World Junior Championships 
Girls' singles

Asian Junior Championships 
Girls' singles

BWF World Tour (2 titles, 5 runners-up) 
The BWF World Tour, which was announced on 19 March 2017 and implemented in 2018, is a series of elite badminton tournaments sanctioned by the Badminton World Federation (BWF). The BWF World Tours are divided into levels of World Tour Finals, Super 1000, Super 750, Super 500, Super 300 (part of the HSBC World Tour), and the BWF Tour Super 100.

Women's singles

Record against selected opponents 
Record against year-end finalists, World Championships semi-finalists, and Olympic quarter-finalists. Accurate as of 5 February 2023.

References

External links 
 
 

1999 births
Living people
Sportspeople from Zhangzhou
Badminton players from Fujian
Chinese female badminton players